Kshatriyas and would-be Kshatriyas: a consideration of the claims of certain Hindu castes to rank with the Rájputs, the descendants of the ancient Kshatriyas was written by Kumar Cheda Singh Varma advocate at the Allahabad High Court. It was published in Allahabad at Pioneer Press in 1904. A Hindi translation, Kshatriya aur Kitram Kshatriya was made by Kumar Rupa Sinha and published in Agra at the Rajput Anglo-Oriental Press in 1907.

Concept
The introduction to the book explains that it was written to examine the expressions of caste politics and Sanskritisation, which had become particularly notable following the 1901 census of India, which had attempted to classify the population into the four varna (ranks in the ritual social hierarchy) of Hinduism.

Reception
Statements of appreciation of Varma's work are stated in Gabrielle Festing's From the land of princes and the 1912 Journal of the Royal Society of Arts.

References

Kshatriya
Books about the caste system in India
Books about India
1904 non-fiction books